Goejeong Station is a station of the Busan Metro Line 1 in Goejeong-dong, Saha District, Busan, South Korea.

External links 

  Cyber station information from Busan Transportation Corporation

Busan Metro stations
Saha District
Railway stations opened in 1994
1994 establishments in South Korea
20th-century architecture in South Korea